Fred Utton (9 April 1873 – 23 January 1939) was a Canadian sports shooter. He competed in the 1000 yard free rifle event at the 1908 Summer Olympics.

References

Further reading
 
 
 

1873 births
1939 deaths
Canadian male sport shooters
Olympic shooters of Canada
Shooters at the 1908 Summer Olympics
People from Lambeth
Sportspeople from London
20th-century Canadian people